The Port of Calafat is one of the largest Romanian river ports, located in the city of Calafat on the Danube River.

References

External links

 Official website

Ports and harbours of Romania